Estcourt is a surname. Notable people with the name include:

Edgar Edmund Estcourt (1816–1884), English churchman
Frederick Estcourt Bucknall (c.1838–1896), South Australian publican, brewer and politician
George Sotheron-Estcourt, 1st Baron Estcourt (1839–1915), British Conservative Party politician
Giles Estcourt (c.1601–1668), English politician
Giles Estcourt (died 1587), MP
James Bucknall Bucknall Estcourt (1803–1855), English major-general and MP
Noël Estcourt (born 1929), Rhodesian sportsman
Nick Estcourt (1942–1978), British climber
Richard Estcourt (1668–1712), English actor
Stephen Estcourt (born 1953), Australian judge
Sir Thomas Estcourt (died 1624) (c. 1570–1624), English lawyer and politician
Thomas Grimston Estcourt (1775–1853), English politician
Thomas Estcourt (died 1818), member of parliament for Cricklade
Thomas E. Sotheron-Estcourt (1881–1958), British Army officer and Conservative Member of Parliament
Thomas H. Sotheron-Estcourt (1801–1876), British Conservative politician

See also
Estcourt baronets
Sotheron (surname)